Calatrava, officially the Municipality of Calatrava , is a 1st class municipality in the province of Negros Occidental, Philippines. According to the 2020 census, it has a population of 82,540 people.

The town is known for its monkey sanctuary.

History
Municipality of Calatrava was formally organized by virtue of Administrative Code of 1917 under Section 68 effective January 1, 1924 through the of Secretary of the Interior for the recommendation to the Governor-General.

Geography

Barangays
Calatrava is politically subdivided into 40 barangays.

Climate

Demographics

The people in the town speak Cebuano, followed by Hiligaynon. Filipino and English are generally understood especially in the urban areas.

Economy

The municipality of Calatrava is predominantly agricultural with almost 60% of its total land area devoted to agricultural use. Sugarcane occupies the largest share of agricultural land with almost one third followed by rice and corn. The total production per year can meet the cereal demand within the municipality with the excess being exported to nearby municipalities and cities.

Other sectors include livestock & poultry and fisheries.

References

External links

 Official website
 [ Philippine Standard Geographic Code]
Philippine census information
Local Governance Performance Management System

Municipalities of Negros Occidental